The Johannessen Nunataks are an isolated, ridgelike outcropping of rocks about  long, standing  south of Mount Weihaupt in the southern extremity of the Outback Nunataks, Victoria Land, Antarctica. They were mapped by the United States Geological Survey from surveys and U.S. Navy air photos, 1959–64, and were named by the Advisory Committee on Antarctic Names for Karl R. Johannessen, a meteorologist at McMurdo Station in 1967–68. These topographical features lie situated on the Pennell Coast, a portion of Antarctica lying between Cape Williams and Cape Adare.

References

Nunataks of Victoria Land
Pennell Coast